Diego Gómez is a retired Colombian football goalkeeper.

Titles

References

Living people
Colombian footballers
1972 births
Footballers from Cali
América de Cali footballers
Millonarios F.C. players
Deportivo Pasto footballers
Independiente Medellín footballers
Cortuluá footballers
Deportes Tolima footballers
Deportes Quindío footballers
Colombia international footballers
2000 CONCACAF Gold Cup players
Categoría Primera A players
Association football goalkeepers